John Lane may refer to:

American politicians
John W. Lane (1835–1888), Texas politician
John C. Lane (1872–1958), Mayor of Honolulu

Canadian politicians
John Gary Lane (born 1942), judge and politician in Saskatchewan, Canada
John Gordon Lane (1916–2001), former Ontario Member of Provincial Parliament
John Lane (Ontario politician) (1818–1890), Irish-born Ontario Member of Provincial Parliament

English politicians
John Lane of Bentley (1609–1667), officer in the Royalist army and a member of Parliament for Lichfield, 1661–1667

Others
John Lane (clothier) (died 1529), of Cullompton, Devon
John Lane (metallurgist) (1678–1741), English metallurgist
John Lane (poet), English poet fl. 1600–1630
John Bryant Lane (1788–1868), English painter
John Quincy Lane (1831–1903), American army officer and general after the American Civil War
John Lane (publisher) (1854–1925), British publisher
Paddy Lane (cricketer) (1886–1937), Australian cricketer, born John Lane
John Lane (writer and artist) (1930-2012), Beaford, Devon
Jackie Lane (footballer) (born 1931), English footballer
J. Michael Lane (1936–2020), American epidemiologist
John A. Lane (born 1955), writer and historian of printing

See also
John Lane Bell (born 1945), British Professor of Philosophy in Canada
Jack Lane (1898–1984), English footballer
Jackie Lane (disambiguation)